Love Destiny 2 may refer to:

Love Destiny 2 (TV series), also known as Phromlikhit, an upcoming Thai television series
Love Destiny: The Movie, also known as Love Destiny 2, an upcoming Thai film